Go Go Amigo is a 1965 Warner Bros. Merrie Melodies cartoon directed by Robert McKimson. The short was released on November 20, 1965, and stars Daffy Duck and Speedy Gonzales.

Plot
Tired of the local Mexican villagers crowding around his display window to watch a running TV set, Daffy Duck (this time the owner of El Daffy's Radio and TV) turns it off and declares that, to watch TV, they must come in and buy a set. 
Meanwhile, in a mousehole in his store, Speedy and his friends are celebrating his birthday. Unfortunately, one thing is missing: music. So Speedy goes into the main storeroom and turns on one of Daffy's radios. 
Daffy abruptly shuts it off, and thus, Speedy does everything in his power to have fiesta music at his party. With Daffy doing everything he can to stop him, even if it means going to the local radio station and holding up the radio DJ at gunpoint, forcing him to play bad Bill Lava music. 
Speedy races to the radio station and subdues Daffy by tying him up on a record player.

Crew
 Director: Robert McKimson
 Story: David Detiege
 Animation: Warren Batchelder, Bob Matz, Manny Perez
 Layout: Dick Ung
 Backgrounds: George deLado
 Film Editor: Lee Gunther
 Voice Characterizations: Mel Blanc, Gonzales Gonzales
 Music: Bill Lava
 Produced by: David H. DePatie and Friz Freleng

See also
List of American films of 1965
 The Golden Age of American animation
 List of Daffy Duck cartoons

References

External links

Merrie Melodies short films
1965 films
1965 animated films
1965 short films
Films directed by Robert McKimson
Daffy Duck films
Speedy Gonzales films
DePatie–Freleng Enterprises short films
Films scored by William Lava
1960s Warner Bros. animated short films
1960s English-language films